Gary Paul Emerson (born 26 September 1963) is an English professional golfer.

Emerson was born in Bournemouth, Hampshire (now Dorset). He turned professional in 1982 and after regular trips to qualifying school finally made it onto the European Tour in 1995. He has won the 1998 Netcom Norwegian Open on the second-tier Challenge Tour and the 2004 Cadillac Russian Open on the main European Tour. 2005 was his best season to date, with a seventy-second place finish on the European Tour Order of Merit. He finished as joint runner-up at the British Masters in 2006 on his way to 76th place on that seasons money list, but his form fell away after that and he lost his European Tour card at the end of 2007.

Professional wins (2)

European Tour wins (1)

1Dual-ranking event with the Challenge Tour

Challenge Tour wins (2)

1Dual-ranking event with the European Tour

Challenge Tour playoff record (0–1)

Results in major championships

Note: Emerson only played in The Open Championship.

CUT = missed the half-way cut
"T" = tied

External links

English male golfers
European Tour golfers
European Senior Tour golfers
Sportspeople from Bournemouth
People from Wimborne Minster
Sportspeople from Dorset
1963 births
Living people